Francisc Ionuț Cristea (born 15 January 2001) is a Romanian professional footballer who plays as a midfielder for Liga II club Politehnica Iași.

Club career

Politehnica Iași
In 2019, Cristea moved to Liga I club Politehnica Iași. On 22 April, he made his league debut in a 1–1 draw against Concordia Chiajna. On 19 May 2021  Cristea scored his first professional goal as Politehnica lost 2–4 against Gaz Metan Mediaș and were subsequently relegated to the Romanian Liga II.

Career Statistics

Club

References

External links
 
 

2001 births
Living people
Sportspeople from Vaslui
Romanian footballers
Association football midfielders
Liga I players
Liga II players
FC Vaslui players
FC Politehnica Iași (2010) players